{{Infobox person
| name               = Hari Bansha Acharya| image              = Hari Bansha Acharya.png
| caption            = 
| native_name        = हरिवंश आचार्य
| native_name_lang   = ne
| birth_date         = 
| birth_place        = Kathmandu, Nepal
| nationality        = Nepalese
| citizenship        = Nepali
| occupation         = Actor, comedian, singer, writer
| spouse             = 
| website            = Official site of MaHa
| other names        = Hari Bahadur
}}

Hari Bansha Acharya is a Nepalese actor, comedian, director, singer and writer. He is known for his method acting. He is one half of the comedy duo MaHa Jodi along with fellow comedian Madan Krishna Shrestha. He is known for his performance as Arjun in the 1997 patriotic drama film Balidaan. He has also performed in the series Madan Bahadur Hari Bahadur as "Hari Bahadur". He also wrote and performed in the film Shatru Gatey.

Personal life
Hari Bansha Acharya was born on 27 Kartik 2014 BS (13 November 1957 AD) in Gairidhara, Kathmandu, to father Homanjaya Acharya and mother Ganesh Kumari. He met his first wife, Meera, in 1982. He has two sons, Trilok Acharya and Mohit Acharya. His first wife, Meera Acharya, suffered from heart disease, and died in 2011. He married his second wife Ramila Pathak in 2012. In 2015, Acharya established The Meera Centre, named for his late wife. The centre provides health and educational services with the aim of contributing to the holistic development of children under five years.

Career

Acharya started his career by performing with Hari Prasad Rimal and Jitendra Mahat Avilashi in 2031 BS on Radio Nepal, then the only radio station in Nepal. In 2032, he joined Rastriya Naach Ghar. He had participated in Gaijatra Mahotsav in 2034 BS. Before performing with Madan Krishna Shrestha and becoming a part of the MAHA Jodi, he had worked in the entertainment field alone for six years.

Acharya has also played in films. Lovipapi, Filim, Rajamati, Silu, Balidaan, Je Bho Ramrai bho, and Tah ta Sarhai Bigris Ni Badri are some of his popular films that were immensely popular in the Nepali film industry. His performance in Balidaan is considered to be one of the finest performance ever in Nepali film history. Some of his remarkable comedy series like Lal Purja, Pandra Gatay, Bhakunde Bhoot, Series of Hari Bahadur and Madan Bahadur, 50/50, and Dashain ko Chyangra, will be cherished by Nepalese even after many years. After 17 years Acharya and Shrestha starred in 2074 multistarrer comedy-drama Satru Gate whose story was written by Acharya. The film became an enormous commercial success and is one of the highest grossing Nepali film ever.

Acharya and his comedy duo are active in social life and were very much noted for their effort in the April Uprising in Nepal, which dethroned the monarchy. The duo was touted for the Presidency by some spheres of the Nepalese population.

 Filmography All films are in Nepali language or else notedTheater programs

Television programs
Acharya has been actively associated with television since its early days in Nepal and has appeared in a number of comedy programs.

Radio programs

MusicSongsHari Bansha Acharya (album)''

Publications
Acharya is also a writer by profession. He has written several books based on social sectors, which were awarded various national prizes.
 Gold Medal — published by Kathmandu Publication
 Mahasan — published by Sajha Prakashan
 Neparujinno Kurasito Seuji (Social and Political Life of Nepal)
 China Harayeko Manchhe (autobiography)
 Hari Bahadur (novel)

Positions held
 Ambassador, UN World Food Program Nepal
 Chairman, Kathmandu Animal Treatment Centre
 Founder, Jana Andolan Health Relief Fund (established during 2nd People's Movement in 2062–2063 BS)
 Executive Director, MaHa Sanchar, Kathmandu
 Vice President, Kathmandu Model Hospital (PHECT)
 Honorary Life Member, Nepal Association of Victoria Sydney, Australia (20 June 1998)
 Honorary Member, Nepal Film Artist National Association
 Founder board member, Tilganga Eye Centre, Kathmandu
 board member, Spinal Injury Organisation, Kathmandu
 board member, Campion Associates, Kathmandu
 Member, Rotary Club of Tripureshwor, Kathmandu
 Member, Nepal Russia Friendship Society, Kathmandu
 Member, Nepal Music Association, Kathmandu

Awards and honours 
 NEFTA awards
 OFA awards
 Honoured in Hasya Byangya Hijo Aaja Bholi 2070

 Jagadamba Shree Puraskar

Notes

References

External links
 
 Lyrics to few of Hari Bansha Acharya's songs

Further reading 
 

1958 births
Living people
Nepalese autobiographers
21st-century Nepalese male writers
20th-century Nepalese male actors
21st-century Nepalese male actors
Actors from Kathmandu
Nepalese male film actors
Nepalese male comedians
21st-century Nepalese screenwriters
20th-century Nepalese screenwriters
Jagadamba Shree Puraskar winners
Khas people